Black Bear Road is an album by country musician C. W. McCall, released on MGM Records in 1975 (see 1975 in music). It is largely considered the album which gave him the most significant boost of his career, almost entirely due to the hit novelty song, "Convoy", that hit the number one spot on both Billboard's Country charts and its Pop charts. The song itself was largely responsible for starting a nationwide citizens' band radio craze. The song "Black Bear Road" in turn popularized the now-infamous road itself, along with its "You don't HAVE to be crazy to drive this road - but it helps" sign.

Track listing
All songs on the original LP release are credited as being written by "C.W. McCall - Bill Fries - Chip Davis".  Bill Fries is the real name of C.W. McCall.

 "Black Bear Road" (Bill Fries, Chip Davis) – 2:00
 "The Silverton" (Fries, Davis) – 2:50
 "Lewis and Clark" (Fries, Davis) - 2:23
 "Oregon Trail" (Fries, Davis) - 2:54
 "Ghost Town" (Fries, Davis) – 3:42
 "Convoy" (Fries, Davis) – 3:48
 "Long Lonesome Road" (Fries, Davis) – 2:10
 "Green River" (Fries, Davis) – 3:10
 "Write Me a Song" (Fries, Davis) - 2:20
 "Mountains on My Mind" (Fries, Davis) - 3:56

Personnel

 C. W. McCall - Vocals, Design
 Sarah Westphalen, Carol Rogers (The Puffys), Dick Solowicz, Milt Bailey, Dick Ronelle, Tom Sinclair - Background Vocals
 Ron Cooley - Guitar
 Bobbie Thomas - Guitar, 5-String Banjo, 4-String Banjo, Pedal Steel Guitar
 Ron Steele - Guitar, 4-String Banjo
 Steve Hanson - Mandolin, 5-String Banjo
 Jackson Berkey - Keyboards, Timpani, Percussion
 Eric Hansen, Jimmy Johnson, Brian Sampson - Bass
 Chip Davis - Drums, Producer, Arranger
 Bill Berg, Don Simmons - Drums
 Gene Badgett - Trumpet
 Dave Kappy - French Horn
 Bill Buntain - Bass Trombone
 Jim Schanilec - Tuba
 Hugh Brown, Dorothy Brown, Merton Shatzkin, Martin Pearson, Alex Sokol, Joe Landes, Beth McCollum, Miriam Duffelmeyer - Strings

Additional personnel

 Don Sears - Producer, Engineer, Design, Photography
 John Boyd - Engineer
 Sheri Leverich - Art Director
 Dudycha, Schirck & Assoc., Inc. - Art/Production

Charts

Weekly charts

Year-end charts

References

External links
 NarrowGauge.org album information for Black Bear Road

C. W. McCall albums
1975 albums
MGM Records albums